Nicolas Vauquelin des Yveteaux (1567–1649) was a French libertine poet, the son of Jean Vauquelin de la Fresnaye.

References

External links
 

French poets
16th-century French writers
16th-century male writers
17th-century French writers
17th-century French male writers
Writers from Normandy
1567 births
1649 deaths
French male poets